Mantas Brazauskis (born 15 June 1990) is a Lithuanian goalball player who competes in international elite competitions. He is a Paralympic champion, World Games champion and double European champion.

References 

1990 births
Living people
Sportspeople from Vilnius
Paralympic goalball players of Lithuania
Goalball players at the 2016 Summer Paralympics
Medalists at the 2016 Summer Paralympics
Goalball players at the 2020 Summer Paralympics